Colac Colac is a locality in the Hume region of the Australian state of Victoria.

There is a half-sealed cycling and walking trail from the Colac Colac Caravan Park in to the town of Corryong.

References

Towns in Victoria (Australia)